The 2016–17 LIU Brooklyn Blackbirds men's basketball team represented The Brooklyn Campus of Long Island University during the 2016–17 NCAA Division I men's basketball season. The Blackbirds, led by fifth-year head coach Jack Perri, played their home games at the Steinberg Wellness Center, with several home games at the Barclays Center, and were members of the Northeast Conference. They finished the season 20–12, 13–5 in NEC play to finish in second place. In the NEC tournament, they lost to Robert Morris in the quarterfinals.

On March 20, 2017, head coach Jack Perri was fired after five seasons at LIU Brooklyn. Former UMass head coach Derek Kellogg was hired as the new head coach on April 18.

Previous season 
The Blackbirds finished the 2015–16 season 16–15, 9–9 in NEC play to finish in a tie for sixth place. They beat Sacred Heart in the quarterfinals of the NEC tournament before losing to Wagner.

Roster

Schedule and results

|-
!colspan=9 style=| Non-conference regular season

  

 
|-
!colspan=9 style=| Northeast Conference regular season    

|-
!colspan=9 style=| NEC tournament

References

LIU Brooklyn Blackbirds men's basketball seasons
LIU Brooklyn
LIU Brooklyn
LIU Brooklyn